The cabinet of Nicolae Rădescu was the government of Romania from 6 December 1944 to 28 February 1945. It was the last non-Communist government of Romania until the Romanian Revolution.

Ministers
The ministers of the cabinet were as follows:

President of the Council of Ministers:
Gen. Nicolae Rădescu (6 December 1944 - 28 February 1945)
Vice President of the Council of Ministers:
Petru Groza (6 December 1944 - 28 February 1945)
Minister of Internal Affairs:
(interim) Gen. Nicolae Rădescu (6 - 14 December 1944)
Gen. Nicolae Rădescu (14 December 1944 - 28 February 1945)
Minister of Foreign Affairs: 
Constantin Vișoianu (6 December 1944 - 28 February 1945)
Minister of Finance:
Mihail Romniceanu (6 December 1944 - 28 February 1945)
Minister of Justice:
Lucrețiu Pătrășcanu (6 December 1944 - 28 February 1945)
Minister of National Education:
Ștefan Voitec (6 December 1944 - 28 February 1945)
Minister of Religious Affairs and the Arts:
Ghiță Pop (6 December 1944 - 28 February 1945)
Minister of War:
Gen. Ion Negulescu (6 December 1944 - 28 February 1945)
Minister of War Production:
Constantin C. (Bebe) Brătianu (6 December 1944 - 28 February 1945)
Minister of Agriculture and Property
Ioan Hudiță (6 December 1944 - 28 February 1945)
Minister of National Economy:
Aurel Leucuția (6 December 1944 - 28 February 1945)
Minister of Communications:
Gheorghe Gheorghiu-Dej (6 December 1944 - 28 February 1945)
Minister of Public Works and Recovery:
Virgil Solomon (6 December 1944 - 28 February 1945)
Minister of Cooperation:
Gheorghe Fotino (6 December 1944 - 28 February 1945)
Minister of Labour:
Lothar Rădăceanu (6 December 1944 - 28 February 1945)
Minister of Social Insurance:
Gheorghe Nicolau (6 December 1944 - 28 February 1945)
Minister of Health and Social Assistance:
Daniel Danielopolu (6 December 1944 - 28 February 1945)
Minister of Minority Nationalities:
Gheorghe Vlădescu-Răcoasa (6 December 1944 - 28 February 1945)

References

Cabinets of Romania
Cabinets established in 1944
Cabinets disestablished in 1945
1944 establishments in Romania
1945 disestablishments in Romania
Romania in World War II